Mazhuvannoor is a panchayat village in the Ernakulam district of Kerala, India. It is located in the Kunnathunad taluk. It is located near the town of Kolenchery. The panchayat headquarters are located at Airapuram.

History 

Once these areas were part of the Cochin kingdom, but during the colonial period the same was part of Travancore kingdom.

Geography 

Mazhuvannoor is located 5 km north of Kolenchery, 12 km west of Muvattupuzha, 17 km south of Perumbaavoor and 35 km east of Ernakulam. Airapuram, Valayanchirangara, Nellad, Mangalathunada, Thattamughal, Valampur, South Mazhuvannoor, Kadakkanad, Perumani  are the noted places in the panchayath.

Mazhuvannoor according to geologists is rich in iron content. The habitat of mazhuvar who are in the iron refining  field make the place MAZHUVAROORU changes to mazhuvannoor.

Kunnathnadu Tehsil
This village is part of Kunnathnadu taluk of Ernakulam district.  Other towns in this area include Kizhakkambalam, Kombanad, Mazhuvannoor, Rayamangalam and thiruvaniyoor.

Demographics 

According to the 2011 census of India, Mazhuvannoor has 3679 households. The literacy rate of the village is 88.38%.

Religion 

Churches include St Thomas Jacobite Syriac Orthodox Cathedral Valiya Palli at South Mazhuvannoor, St George Jacobite Syrian Orthodox Chapel at Mangalathunada, St Mary's Jacobite Syrian Orthodox Chapel at Thattamughal, St George Malankara Catholic Church at Mangalathunada, St George Malankara Orthodox Cathedral, Kunnakkurudy, St George Jacobite Syrian Orthodox Church at Kunnakkurudy, St George Jacobite Syrian Orthodox Church at Perumani, St Peter's and St Paul's Orthodox Church at Valayanchirangara, Guardian Angel Retirement Home of Jacobite Syrian Orthodox Church at Airapuram, Mount Horeb at Mangalathunada etc.  are the Christian churches or institutions in Mazhuvannoor panchayath. There are Hindu temples at Blandevar, Nellad, Valampur, South Mazhuvannoor etc.

Institutions 

Also there are veterinary hospitals, ayurvedic hospitals, colleges, high schools, upper primary schools, lower primary schools etc. in Mazhuvannoor especially at South Mazhuvannoor, Mangalathunada, Mukkotra, Airapuram, Valayanchirangara etc. Sree Sankara Vidyapeetam Arts and Sciences College at Valayanchirangara, CET College of Applied Sciences at Airapuram are noted colleges in this panchayath. Christians and Hindus constitute the majority of people. Christian community is predominantly Jacobite Christians or Syriac Orthodox Christians. There are Syro-Malabar, Syro-Malankara, Malankara Orthodox, Pentecostal, Brethren and Marthomma Christians locally.

Hindu community includes predominantly Scheduled Caste and Ezhava communities. Also there are presence of Brahmin, Nair and other Hindu community locally. The presence of Muslim community is also locally seen.

Eminent Personalities

Infrastructure 

There is a chain of 4 Schools located in the middle of Mazhuvannoor. 2 Govt LP Schools, SRV UP School and MRSV High School. All the basic facilities including Bank, Post Office, Hospital are available in Mazhuvannoor.

Also, the Haritha vegetable market in Mangalathunada is a noted vegetable market in Kerala State.

References 

Villages in Kunnathunad taluk